North Shore is an American prime-time soap opera that aired on Fox on  Mondays at 8 p.m. EST (7 p.m. CST) for seven months in 2004 and 2005. It centered on the staff and guests of the fictional Grand Waimea Hotel and Resort (actually the real-life Turtle Bay Resort located near Kahuku, O'ahu) on Oahu's North Shore in Hawaii.

From Fox's website:
 Intrigue abounds at the Grand Waimea Hotel, an exclusive Hawaiian escape for the wealthy, powerful and beautiful. Hawaiian native Jason Matthews runs the hotel and makes sure every guest gets everything they need. But when former flame Nicole Booth arrives as the hotel's new Director of Guest Relations, Jason's world is turned upside down. But Grand Waimea owner, Vincent Colville, is staying on top of him to make sure his past with Nicole won't affect their work life.

North Shore premiered on June 14, 2004, with a 13-episode commitment from Fox. The show was canceled in January 2005 after a 21-episode, single-season run. The show ended on a cliffhanger, and the final episode of the series has only had a single airing, not being shown in most territories (including America).

Plot
The central character is Jason Matthews, General Manager of the Grand Waimea. In the first episode, Nicole Booth is hired as the new Director of Guest Relations. She is the daughter of a ruthless billionaire, and an old flame of Jason's who broke his heart years before. At the end of the first episode, Nicole reveals to Jason that she broke up with him because her father wanted her to date someone more successful, and he threatened to have Jason fired from the hotel he was working at the time. The chances for rekindled romance are then dashed when Nicole reveals she has become engaged since they broke up.

Later in the series, Nicole told Jason that she returned to Hawaii to seek him out before getting married, because she wanted to know if there was still a chance for their relationship.

Cast and characters

Main
 Kristoffer Polaha as Jason Matthews, the General Manager of the Grand Waimea, who shares a past with Nicole.
 Brooke Burns as Nicole Booth, the new Director of Guest Relations, and Jason's former flame who broke his heart years before.
 Corey Sevier as Gabriel McKay, a lifeguard (he seems to alternate between guarding the pool and the beach); in episode three it was mentioned that he is planning to "turn pro" as a surfer. He does end up turning pro, with varying degrees of success.
 Nikki DeLoach as MJ Bevans, a waitress at the hotel bar; she is trying to start her own island clothing line. She starts the show in a relationship with Chris, but they end up breaking up. However, they get back together by the end of the show/season.
 Jason Momoa as Frankie Seau, the hotel bartender. He ends the season involved with Tessa.
 Jay Kenneth Johnson as Chris Remsen, MJ's nascent boyfriend and proprietor of an extreme sports business. Despite breaking up, they end up back together by the final episode.

 Amanda Righetti as Tessa Lewis, a former con artist who manipulates her way into the Assistant Concierge position. By the end of the show, she is involved with Frankie.
 James Remar as Vincent Colville, the hotel owner; he was in love with Nicole's mother before her family forced her to marry Walter Booth.

Recurring
 Michael Ontkean as Gordy Matthews, Jason's father and a local surfing legend who owns a local bar and surfboard shop; his home was burned down in the first season and Jason suspects Walter Booth was involved.
 Josh Hopkins as Morgan Holt, Nicole's fiancé who works for her father in New York as Head of Hotel Acquisitions. Morgan visited the hotel for an extended period, and his relationship with Jason vacillated from friendly to hostile and vice versa several times. Nicole left Morgan at the altar during the first season. He hasn't been seen since.
 Robert Kekaula as Sam, the head of hotel security.
 Christopher McDonald as Walter Booth, Nicole's billionaire father who wants to buy the Grand Waimea by whatever means necessary; he and Vincent have a long-standing rivalry dating back to Vincent's affair with Walter's wife; Vincent is convinced Walter killed his wife as revenge. He ends up in jail.
 Shannen Doherty as Alexandra Hudson, Walter Booth's supposed illegitimate child by a secretary – thus making her Nicole's half-sister. She conspires with her father to take over the Grand Waimea. She ends up in a position of power in the hotel. Though none of the other characters, with the exception of Chris whom she briefly dates, really like her, a few do respect her.
 Dominic Purcell as Tommy Ravetto

Guest stars
 Dylan Bruno as Trey, MJ's former boyfriend and pro surfer. He tries to win MJ back, even kidnapping her at one point, before she is rescued by Chris and Gabriel.

Episodes

Critical reception
Critical reviews tended towards the low scale, with most critics acknowledging that North Shore was not meant to be high-brow theater:

 "North Shore seems the perfect summer show, a chance to gawk at toned flesh and to smirk over double entendres. [...] But most of the time, North Shore plays like a bland hybrid of Baywatch and Hotel. But North Shore could last because the people are attractive, the Hawaiian locales are prettier and the competition offers reruns."—The Orlando Sentinel

 "There's not a lot of deep thinking at this resort, just enough hanky panky to keep things from getting too slow. The danger of this type of drama is if you have to turn off your brain to watch it, you have to remember to turn it back on when it's over." – The Salt Lake Tribune

 "North Shore [is] the new undisputed king of the bad and the beautiful...[the show] has a secret weapon: bathing suits. This show is an excuse to see sexy, half-naked people on your television set once a week. Mute the dialogue and you’ll double your pleasure." – The Washington Blade

External links
 

2004 American television series debuts
2005 American television series endings
English-language television shows
Fox Broadcasting Company original programming
American television soap operas
American primetime television soap operas
Television series by 20th Century Fox Television
Television shows set in Hawaii
Television shows filmed in Hawaii